Murton is a civil parish in the Eden District, Cumbria, England.  It contains eleven listed buildings that are recorded in the National Heritage List for England.  Of these, two are listed at Grade II*, the middle of the three grades, and the others are at Grade II, the lowest grade.  The parish contains the villages of Murton and Hilton and the hamlet of Brackenber, and is otherwise rural.  Most of the listed buildings are houses and associated structures, farmhouses and farm buildings, the other buildings consisting of two village pumps, a bridge, and a disused railway viaduct.


Key

Buildings

References

Citations

Sources

Lists of listed buildings in Cumbria
Listed building